The Dragon, The Young Master is a 1978 kung fu comedy directed by Kim Si Hyun and starring Dragon Lee and Yuen Qiu. It was distributed in America in 1982 and is also known by other English titles, including The Deadly Silver Ninja.

Plot
Pai Wu Lang, disguised as the "Silver Ninja", arrives in a Manchurian mining town seeking his father's killer. His search is complicated by a cache of jewels, the reward of a spy for Japan, buried somewhere on the mountain. He saves a flower seller, Xue Hua, and her blind father from government thugs, then discovers that the old man caused his father's death—accidentally. When Xue's father is himself murdered, she and Pai join forces to clean up the town.

Cast
Dragon Lee as Pai Wu Lang
Yuen Qiu as Xue Hua
Kim Ki Joo
Lee Ye Min as blind old man
Choi Min Kyu
Baek Hwang Gi
Chiang Tao
Liu Jun Kuk
Han Ying Chieh 
Han Quo Yen
Lee Suk Koo
 Li Chun (extra)

Production
The movie was produced by the Hong Kong "Jia's Motion Picture Company". Besides Joseph Lai and Tomas Tang, Godfrey Ho (uncredited in the movie) was also involved in the low-budget production.

External links

1978 films
1978 martial arts films
1970s martial arts films
Bruceploitation films
Kung fu films